Fenay Bridge and Lepton railway station served the villages of Lepton and Fenay Bridge, West Riding of Yorkshire, England, from 1867 to 1965 on the Kirkburton Branch.

History 
The station was opened as Fenay Bridge on 7 October 1867 by the London and North Western Railway. Its name was changed to  Fenay Bridge and Lepton on 1 September 1897. It closed to passengers on 28 July 1930 but remained open for goods until 5 April 1965. The track was lifted in 1966.

References 

Disused railway stations in West Yorkshire
Former London and North Western Railway stations
Railway stations in Great Britain opened in 1867
Railway stations in Great Britain closed in 1930
1867 establishments in England
1965 disestablishments in England